Sophie Newton is the Chief Operating Officer at Brainlabs Digital, a pay-per-click marketing agency.

Early life and family 
Newton attended South Hampstead High School, which she says helped to shape her career in technology. "South Hampstead gave me the confidence to fight for what I believe in and showed me how rewarding it is to work on something that I am passionate about". She completed a master's degree in mathematics at the University of Oxford in 2011, where she finished top of the year. Newton was awarded Oxford's Gibbs Mathematics Prize.

Newton is related to Albert Einstein.

Career 
Brainlabs Digital are focused on the use of data and statistics to scientifically optimize web businesses. Newton joined Brainlabs in 2013 and has since been personally responsible for £4 million of new business. Since Newton became director she has designed training programs for new staff and built new technology, picking up 11 industry awards. Newton notes that despite the data-driven environment, it is essential to have a creative, collaborative mindset.

In 2017, Brainlabs was listed first on Deloitte Tech Tack's Fast 50 for UK companies, and 4th in the Financial Times' 1000 Fastest Growing Companies in Europe.

Equality 
Brainlabs are renowned for challenging the toxic culture of technology. When Newton joined Brainlabs Digital, she analyzed pay across all staff and found an average difference of 8.6% between men's and women's salaries. After consulting her team, Newton decided to increase women's salaries by 8.6%, a "pay gap tax" that has resulted in Brainlabs boasting 50:50 men and women employees.

She is recognized as a leader in workplace equality. In 2016 Newton won the Institute of Practitioners in Advertising Women of Tomorrow Award. In 2017 she won the FDM Everywoman in Tech Inspiration Award.

References

External links
 Brainlabs Digital

Alumni of the University of Oxford
British women in business
Living people
Year of birth missing (living people)